Tensuiyama Masanori (born 8 December 1940 as Masanori Ikeda) is a former sumo wrestler from Tensui, Kumamoto, Japan. He made his professional debut in May 1956, and reached the top division in May 1965. His highest rank was maegashira 10. He left the sumo world upon retirement in September 1968.

Career record
The Kyushu tournament was first held in 1957, and the Nagoya tournament in 1958.

See also
Glossary of sumo terms
List of past sumo wrestlers
List of sumo tournament second division champions

References

1940 births
Living people
Japanese sumo wrestlers
Sumo people from Kumamoto Prefecture